Sedyash (Siźäş) is a rural locality (a village) in Oktyabrsky Selsoviet, Blagoveshchensky District, Bashkortostan, Russia. The population was 18 as of 2010.

Geography 
Sedyash is located 67 km northeast of Blagoveshchensk (the district's administrative centre) by road. Osipovka is the nearest rural locality.

References 

Rural localities in Blagoveshchensky District